Loyd Thomas "Preacher" Roberts (1907 – July 4, 1989) was an American college football and college basketball player and coach.  He played football and basketball at Tulane University.  Roberts served as the head football coach at Arkansas State Teachers College—now known as the University of Central Arkansas in 1941 and East Tennessee State College—now known  as East Tennessee State University—from  1947 to 1951, compiling a career college football coaching record of 26–26–2.  He was also the head basketball coach at Arkansas State Teachers in 1941–42, the Virginia Military Institute (VMI) in 1946–47, and East Tennessee State in 1947–48, tallying a career college basketball mark of 36–25.

Playing career
Roberts played both football and basketball for the Tulane Green Wave of Tulane University in New Orleans, Louisiana. His brother, Floyd Roberts, was called "Little Preacher" and played as a halfback for Tulane next to Don Zimmerman.

Football
Roberts was a prominent center for Tulane Green Wave football team, including the Southern Conference (SoCon) championship football teams of 1929 and 1930, quarterbacked by Red Dawson. Roberts wore number 45.

1929
Roberts anchored the line on the undefeated SoCon champion 1929 team.

1930
Roberts was elected captain of the 1930 team. He was selected All-Southern.

Coaching career

Central Arkansas
Roberts spent a year coaching for the Central Arkansas Bears, compiling a record of 3–6.

VMI
After serving in the United States Navy as a lieutenant during World War II, Roberts was hired as line coach at the Virginia Military Institute (VMI), working under head football coach Pooley Hubert.

East Tennessee State
Roberts spent five seasons as the head football coach at East Tennessee State University in Johnson City, Tennessee from 1947 to 1951, compiling a record of 23–20–2. He also served as the basketball coach for one season in 1947–48 and was the athletic director from 1947 to 1953.

Death
Thomas died on July 4, 1989, at Johnson City Medical Center in Johnson City, Tennessee.

Head coaching record

College football

References

External links
 

1907 births
1989 deaths
All-Southern college football players
American football centers
American men's basketball players
United States Navy personnel of World War II
Basketball coaches from Oklahoma
Basketball players from Oklahoma
Central Arkansas Bears and Sugar Bears athletic directors
Central Arkansas Bears basketball coaches
Central Arkansas Bears football coaches
East Tennessee State Buccaneers athletic directors
East Tennessee State Buccaneers men's basketball coaches
East Tennessee State Buccaneers football coaches
High school basketball coaches in Louisiana
High school football coaches in Louisiana
Iowa State Cyclones football coaches
People from Stigler, Oklahoma
Tulane Green Wave football players
Tulane Green Wave men's basketball players
United States Navy officers
VMI Keydets basketball coaches
VMI Keydets football coaches